Cynthia Lee Fontaine is the stage name of Carlos Díaz Hernández, a Puerto Rican drag performer and reality television personality from Austin, Texas, best known for competing on the eighth and ninth seasons of RuPaul's Drag Race. She won the title of Miss Congeniality on season 8.

Early life and education
Hernández was born in San Juan, Puerto Rico as the oldest child of Maria Hernandez. He has a degree in clinical psychology and worked in the mental health field for six years before starting drag. Hernández began doing drag in Puerto Rico in 2006, and moved to Killeen, Texas in 2008, where he started performing at Oil Can Harry's. He moved to Austin in 2011 and continued performing.

Career
Fontaine competed on the eighth season of RuPaul's Drag Race, which premiered on March 7, 2016. During the show, she frequently referred to her "cucu", meaning buttocks, which became a part of the show's slang. Entertainment Weekly said "cucu" has evolved "into the queer pop cultural canon". Fontaine was the third queen eliminated, garnering a 10th-place finish. Even though she was only on the show for three episodes, Fontaine was voted Miss Congeniality by the fans, giving her the distinction of being voted Miss Congeniality while having spent the least amount of time on the show compared to other award recipients.

Fontaine was invited back for RuPaul's Drag Race season 9 as the surprise 14th queen. The show premiered on March 24, 2017. In episode six, Fontaine portrayed Sofia Vergara for Snatch Game, an impersonation that was not received well by the judges. The A.V. Club wrote "Cynthia Lee Fontaine’s Sofia Vergara is the big disaster of this "Snatch Game," and even without the largely incomprehensible dialogue, it's a failure on a visual level." Fontaine ended up securing once again the 10th-place finish, being sent home in a lipsync challenge against Peppermint. In an interview with Vulture, Fontaine said: 

The Houston Chronicle, lamenting her short run on the show in season 8, stated Fontaine was "like a bilingual Tammie Brown", referencing another queen from season 1 of the show. Denver Pride called her "a fixture of the Austin drag scene". Fontaine is a regular guest at the RuPaul's Drag Cons. She appeared at RuPaul's DragCon LA 2016 and 2017, and at RuPaul's DragCon NYC in 2017 and 2019.

In November 2017, Fontaine participated in Queens United/Reinas Unidas, a benefit show organized by Phi Phi O'Hara in support of Puerto Rico following Hurricane Maria. The show raised over $80,000. Fontaine stated, "Puerto Rico, you are part of our heart in the United States of America. I'm Puerto Rican. I love you from the bottom of my heart, and you've got our support." In September 2018, Fontaine became the third drag queen ever hosted at Bowdoin College in Brunswick, Maine. Previous drag queens performed there in 2012 and 2015. The event, hosted by the Latin American Student Organization, included a performance and interview, which "touched on themes of family, health and getting out of one's comfort zone." On her YouTube channel, Fontaine has two shows: CuCu Confessions and Memoirs of My CuCu. She also headlines a one-woman show called Cynthia Lee Fontaine: More Intimate CuCu Confessions, which she performs around the United States.

Music 
Fontaine released her first single "Pegajosa" in November 2018.  Writing for World of Wonder, James St. James called the song "fabulous" and the accompanying music video "ultra-fabuloso".

Personal life and recognition
Fontaine was diagnosed with stage 1 liver cancer in 2015, two weeks after filming the third episode of the eighth season of Drag Race. He stated during the filming of the show he lost 47 pounds. After four rounds of chemotherapy, he went into remission. He also revealed on the show that he almost performed at Pulse nightclub the night of the Orlando shooting in 2016. He stated, "we never expect that a tragedy like this would happen in our community. We thought we'd finally built a safe space."

The City of Austin was set to proclaim March 26, 2020, as Cynthia Lee Fontaine Day, but had to postpone because of the COVID-19 pandemic in Texas.

Filmography

Television

Music videos

Web series

Discography

Singles

References

External links

 
 

Living people
Hispanic and Latino American drag queens
LGBT Hispanic and Latino American people
LGBT people from Texas
People from Austin, Texas
People from Killeen, Texas
Puerto Rican drag queens
Cynthia Lee Fontaine
1981 births